Askinsky District (Asqın rayonı) is an administrative and municipal district (raion), one of the fifty-four in the Republic of Bashkortostan, Russia. It is located in the north of the republic. Its administrative center is the rural locality (a selo) of Askino. As of the 2010 Census, the total population of the district was 21,272, with the population of Askino accounting for 32.5% of that number.

History
The district was established in August 1930.

Administrative and municipal status
Within the framework of administrative divisions, Askinsky District is one of the fifty-four in the Republic of Bashkortostan. The district is divided into fifteen selsoviets, comprising seventy-four rural localities. As a municipal division, the district is incorporated as Askinsky Municipal District. Its fifteen selsoviets are incorporated as fifteen rural settlements within the municipal district. The selo of Askino serves as the administrative center of both the administrative and municipal district.

Economy
Agricultural and forestry areas dominate in the district. Agricultural lands occupy , or 36.7% of the total area. The main crops are rye, wheat, potatoes, and beef; there are many livestock farms. Logging is conducted in the district.

References

Notes

Sources

Districts of Bashkortostan
States and territories established in 1930